Joyride is an album by Pieces of a Dream issued in 1986 on Manhattan Records. The album reached No. 3 on the Billboard Traditional Jazz Albums chart and No. 18 on the Billboard Top Soul Albums chart.

Track listing

Personnel

Musicians
Randy Bowland - guitar
Dennis Collins - backing vocals
Garry Glenn - lead and backing vocals
Curtis Harmon - drums, vocals, drum samples
Bernard Wright, Henry Horne, Kaz Silver, Denise King - keyboards
James K. Lloyd - percussion, keyboards
Marlon McLain - guitar, percussion
Chude Mondlane - percussion, backing vocals
Lenny White, Maurice White - percussion
Sybil Thomas - backing vocals

Charts

Singles

References

1986 albums
Pieces of a Dream (band) albums
Manhattan Records albums
Albums produced by Maurice White
Albums produced by Lenny White